The National Indian Muslim Alliance Party (Jawi: ڤرتي ڤريكتن اينديا مسلم ناسيونل; ; abbreviated IMAN) is a Malaysian Indian-Muslim based political party renamed in September 2020 from the initially Parti India Muslim Bersatu Malaysia abbreviated PIBM registered in 2019.

General Election Results

State election results 
The party contested one seat, Machap Jaya state seat in Malacca State Legislative Assembly, in the 2021 Malacca state election but failed in its maiden electoral debut with the sole candidate lost its deposits.

Leadership
 President
	Mohammed Mosin Abdul Razak

See also
Politics of Malaysia
List of political parties in Malaysia
Malaysian Indian Muslim Congress (KIMMA)

References

External links
 
 

Political parties established in 2019
Political parties in Malaysia
2019 establishments in Malaysia
Islamic political parties in Malaysia
Conservative parties in Malaysia
Political parties of minorities
Identity politics
Indian-Malaysian culture